Velshi is an Indian (Khoja) surname. Notable people with the surname include:

 Ali Velshi (born 1969), Canadian journalist and host of MSNBC's Velshi; son of Murad Velshi
 Murad Velshi (born 1935), businessman in Africa and a member of the Legislative Assembly of Ontario; father of Ali Velshi
 Alykhan Velshi (born 1984), Canadian lawyer, policy analyst and ministerial assistant 
 Rumina Velshi, Canadian engineer and civil servant, President of the Canadian Nuclear Safety Commission

Indian surnames
Surnames of Indian origin
Gujarati-language surnames
Khoja Ismailism